In 2014, there were 29 new This American Life episodes.

Act 1: Takes One to Know One
Act 2: Heels on the Bus
Act 3: No Man Left Behind
Act 4: Deep Dark Open Secret

Act 1: Do You Hear What I Hear?
Act 2: Sunrise, Sun-Get
Act 3: They Love a Man in a Uniform

Act 1: Mexican Beach Doctor
Act 2: Long Talk on a Short Pier
Act 3: The Beachcomber
Act 4: Now We Are Five

Act 1: Not Okay Cupid
Act 2: Hungry Hungry People
Act 3: Start Me Up
Act 4: Run on Sentence
Act 5: Happy Accident

Act 1: Act 1
Act 2: Act 2
Act 3: Act 3

Act 1: Flight Simulation
Act 2: Phone Home
Act 3: The Hostess With the Toastess

Act 1: The Road To Badness
Act 2: The Devil Went Down To Jersey
Act 3: This is Gonna Hurt Me a Lot More than It's Gonna Hurt You
Act 4: We Are Fine Parents

Act 1: The Hounds Of Blairsville
Act 2: Help Wanted

Act 1: Death
Act 2: Taxes

Act 1: High On The Corporate Ladder
Act 2: You Were So High
Act 3: Bottom Of The Eighth
Act 4: Straight Man
Act 5: DEA Agent Takes A Hit

Act 1: When May Day Falls In April
Act 2: Government Assistance
Act 3: Horse Of A Different Color

Act 1: Blunt Force
Act 2: One Life To Live
Act 3: The Blunder Years

Act 1: Seeing The Forrest Through The Little Trees
Act 2: Unsafety Exit
Act 3: I'm The One Who Knocks

Act 1: 21 Chump Street: The Musical
Act 2: Of Mice And Men
Act 3: How Do You Slow This Thing Down (Podcast Only)
Act 4: Bus! Stop!

Act 1: I Am The Eggplant
Act 2: I Always Feel Like Somebody's Watching Me
Act 3: I Am Iraq, I Am An Island

Act 1: Jill House Rules
Act 2: Cop Versus Cop

Act 1: Absolutely Stabulous
Act 2: By the Waters of Haggle-On
Act 3: One Woman Show

Act 1: I Believe I Can Fly
Act 2: Rainy Days and Mondys
Act 3: Pescatarian

Act 1: I Got 99 Problems and a Pitch Is One
Act 2: The Business of Show
Act 3: The Other Real World

Act 1: A Not So Simple Majority, Part 1
Act 2: A Not So Simple Majority, Part 2

Act 1: Mad Man
Act 2: Silent Partner
Act 3: Wait Wait... Don't Film Me
Act 4: Bill Clinton's 7-Year-Old Brother

Act 1: Act 1
Act 2: Act 2

Act 1: Presents Series 1, Episode 1 of the spin-off podcast Serial, also titled The Alibi.

Act 1: Time Out
Act 2: The Guinea Pig Becomes the Scientist
Act 3: The Talking Cure

External links
This American Lifes radio archive for 2014

2014
This American Life
This American Life